USS Minerva (SP-425) was a United States Navy patrol vessel in commission from 1917 to 1919.
 
Minerva was built as a private motorboat of the same name in 1914 by the Luders Marine Construction Company at Stamford, Connecticut. On 7 May 1917, the U.S. Navy acquired her under a free lease from her owner, Mrs. Elizabeth C. Bowen of New York City, for use as a section patrol boat during World War I. The boat was commissioned on 20 July 1917 as USS Minerva (SP-425.

Assigned to the 3rd Naval District, Minerva served as a patrol boat in the coastal waters of the New York City area for the rest of World War I. She also guarded the submarine nets and torpedo nets in the approaches to New York Harbor.

Minerva was decommissioned and returned to her owner on 14 January 1919.

References

Department of the Navy Naval History and Heritage Command Online Library of Selected Images: Civilian Ships: Minerva (American Motor Boat, 1914). Served as USS Minerva (SP-425) in 1917-1919
NavSource Online: Section Patrol Craft Photo Archive: Minerva (SP 425)

Patrol vessels of the United States Navy
World War I patrol vessels of the United States
Ships built in Stamford, Connecticut
1914 ships